L. Ron (or L Ron) may refer to:

In people:
L. Ron Hubbard, (1911–1986), founder of Scientology
L. Ron Hubbard, Jr., (1934–1991), son of L. Ron Hubbard

In music:
L. Ron (album), a noise rock album by Barkmarket

In comics:
L-Ron, fictional DC Comics character